The Lee's Summit R-7 School District serves parts of Lee's Summit, Kansas City, Missouri, rural eastern Jackson County and the entirety of Unity Village, Greenwood, Lake Winnebago, and Lake Lotawana  in the State of Missouri. Their website is under the URL lsr7.org.

Schools
There are 29 schools in the district, including:

Elementary
Great Beginnings Early Education Center
Cedar Creek Elementary School 
Greenwood Elementary School 
Hawthorn Hill Elementary School 
Hazel Grove Elementary School 
Highland Park Elementary School
Lee's Summit Elementary School 
Longview Farm Elementary School 
Mason Elementary School 
Meadow Lane Elementary School 
Pleasant Lea Elementary School 
Prairie View Elementary School 
Richardson Elementary School 
Summit Pointe Elementary School 
Sunset Valley Elementary School
Trailridge Elementary School 
Underwood Elementary School 
Westview Elementary School 
Woodland Elementary School

Middle Schools
Bernard C. Campbell Middle School 
East Trails Middle School
Pleasant Lea Middle School 
Summit Lakes Middle School 
High Schools
Lee's Summit High School
Lee's Summit West High School 
Lee's Summit North High School
Summit Ridge Academy
Summit Technology Academy
Miller Park Center

Superintendent

David Buck is the superintendent. He began serving as the district's superintendent on July 1, 2020. Previously Emily Miller served as the district's interim superintendent.

Dennis L. Carpenter served as superintendent of the District from July 1st, 2017, to July 23rd, 2019. He resigned amid racial-equity policy disagreements between himself and entities in the Lee's Summit community. Upon his exit from the school board, the District paid $750,000 to Carpenter as part of his negotiation to step down as superintendent. Carpenter was the first black superintendent of the Lee's Summit R-VII School District.

References

External links
 

School districts in Missouri
Education in Jackson County, Missouri
Education in Cass County, Missouri